The NU Rock Awards was an annual accolade presented from 1994 to 2010 by the Metro Manila-based radio station NU 107, known for prominent performances by the most influential pinoy rock artists of each year.

History
The first NU 107 Rock Awards was held at The Music Hall in Annapolis St., Greenhills on November 15, 1994. Originally meant to be a small gathering to give recognition to the rock community, it slowly became a much anticipated annual event. Pepe Smith won the Rock Legend Award. and the Dawn won the Rock Achievement Award.

The first "Song of the Year Award" was given to Alamid for "Your Love". The song went on to heavy airplay and was the first NU 107 exclusive to cross over to other formats. Afterimage was very first winner of the Artist of the Year award. The first Album of the Year award was presented to the Eraserheads' first album Ultraelectromagneticpop!. The Eraserheads received the Album of the Year award in the following two years with their albums Circus (1995) and Cutterpillow (1996), making them the only artist to win in the same category three years in a row.

Pambansang Banda ng Pilipinas Parokya Ni Edgar also won their "Best New Artists" in 1996 and also won 8 times overall years later.
"Producer of the Year" category
The Dawn has performed in the Rock Awards eleven times.

The first "Video of the Year" awardwas given to "Ang Huling El Bimbo" by the Eraserheads.

In 1997, they added a new category "Producer of the Year".

There has only been one tie in the history of the Rock Awards, in 1999, when the judges made Wolfgang's Serve in Silence and Sandwich's Grip Stand Throw joint Albums of the Year.

Raimund Marasigan has the most awards, for his work as a member of Eraserheads and Sandwich, and as an album producer for other bands.

The first band to win the Rock Awards’ "Raw Award" was Fatal Posporos. The Raw Award is given to the best unsigned artist of the year.

In 2000, Punk's Not Dead, an all-star tribute band made up of Myra Ruaro (Brownbeat All Stars), Louie Talan (Razorback), Diego Castillo (Sandwich), Raimund Marasigan (Sandwich), Zach Lucero and Aia de Leon (Imago), performed a medley of past Song of the Year winners in the style of The Ramones.

In 2004, NU 107, acknowledging the growing role of women in the local rock scene, made the first Female Rock Icon Award to Cynthia Alexander.

Before it became a rock anthem of sorts, Bamboo's "Noypi" was first performed at the 2003 NU 107 Rock Awards, before their album As The Music Plays was released.

Despite being held during a typhoon, the 2004 Rock Awards ceremony was the best attended, with over 4,000 rock fans filling the World Trade Center.

In 2005, there were a record twelve nominees for the Song Of The Year Award.

The 17th and final Rock Awards was held on October 29, 2010.

List of winners

Best New Artist

Artist of the Year

Song of the Year

Album of the Year

Best Live Act

Listener's Choice

Best Album Packaging

Vocalist Of The Year

Guitarist Of The Year

Bassists Of The Year

Drummer Of The Year

Keyboardist of the Year

Best Male

Best Female

In The Raw Awards

Rising Sun Awards

Producer of the Year

Music Video of the Year

Hall of Famer

References

See also
 NU 107
 Wish 107.5
 Wish 107.5 Music Awards

Progressive Broadcasting Corporation
Philippine music awards
1994 establishments in the Philippines
2010 disestablishments in the Philippines
Rock music awards